The Snowy River Shire was a local government area in the Australian Alps region of New South Wales, Australia from 1939 until May 2016. It was named after the Snowy River that runs through it. Prior to 1936, it had been named as Dalgety Shire since establishment in 1906.

History
The Dalgety Shire Council changed its name to Snowy River Shire in 1939. The council seat was at Berridale, which caused delays when mail and deliveries were erroneously sent to Dalgety. Dalgety was one of several new shires established in June 1906.

On 12 May 2016, the Snowy River Shire merged with Bombala and Cooma-Monaro shires to form the Snowy Monaro Regional Council.

The last mayor of the Snowy River Shire was Cr. John Cahill, an independent politician.

Towns and localities
The administrative centre of the former Shire was the town of Berridale, with the sub-alpine town of Jindabyne providing the main commercial centre for the southern Snowy Mountains resort area. The town of Adaminaby is the service centre for the northern snowfields resorts and the starting point for most trout fishers eager to test their skills in the rivers and streams or the enormous expanse of Lake Eucumbene.  It also includes the village of Dalgety, Anglers Reach, the ghost town of Kiandra, and the ski resorts of Thredbo, Perisher, Smiggin Holes, Guthega, and Blue Cow.

Council

Final composition and election method
Prior to its abolition, Snowy River Shire Council was composed of seven councillors, including the mayor, elected for fixed four-year terms of office. The mayor was directly elected while the six other councillors were elected proportionally as one entire ward. The last election was held on 8 September 2012, and the makeup of the former council, including the mayor, was as follows:

The last Council, elected in 2012, in order of election, was:

References 

Former local government areas of New South Wales
2016 disestablishments in Australia
1939 establishments in Australia